For the First Time (stylized in sentence case as For the first time) is the debut studio album by British rock band Black Country, New Road, released on 5 February 2021 through Ninja Tune. The album was preceded by the release of two singles, "Science Fair" and "Track X", and also includes re-recorded versions of their 2019 debut singles "Athens, France" and "Sunglasses". Known for experimenting with post-punk, klezmer, free jazz, and math rock, the band showcased a clear preference for atmospherics over post-punk on For the First Time.

The album received widespread acclaim from music critics for its experimental sound and poetic lyricism. It was nominated for the Mercury Prize in 2021. It was successful commercially, debuting at No. 4 on the UK Albums Chart.

Background and release
Black Country, New Road released their debut single, "Athens, France" in January 2019 through Speedy Wunderground. It was followed by their second single, "Sunglasses", released later that year. These releases garnered attention from critics, for experimenting with post-punk, klezmer, and free jazz sounds. On 28 October 2020, the group announced the release of their debut studio album, For the First Time. "Science Fair" was simultaneously served as the album's lead single. The band also shared the track list which revealed that the record would feature reworked versions of "Athens, France" and "Sunglasses". On 11 January 2021, "Track X" was released as the second single from the album. The album was produced by Andy Savours, and recorded in March 2020. According to the band, For the First Time sums up their first 18-month journey in which they "wanted it to sound exactly how we love to sound live." The album was released on 5 February 2021 through Ninja Tune. Prior to the album's release, it was listed as one of the most anticipated albums of February 2021 by several media publications, including Evening Standard and The Quietus.

Critical reception

At Metacritic, which assigns a weighted average rating out of 100 to reviews from mainstream publications, this release received an average score of 83 based on 17 reviews, indicating "universal acclaim". Aggregator AnyDecentMusic? gave the album an 8.2 out of 10, based on their assessment of the critical consensus.

Kitty Empire of The Guardian regarded For the First Time as one of the best albums of the year, writing that it portrayed "a joyful disregard for genre." Writing for Clash, Hayley Scott called the album "a significant milestone in modern guitar music" that established Black Country, New Road as "a much-needed anomaly." Reviewing for The Line of Best Fit, Lauren Down wrote the album is "ferocious and endlessly intelligent, highly considered and wildly improvised, eked out with bristling tension and set alight with a burning intensity and a knowing smile." Charlie McQuaid of Exclaim! felt that the record is "an honest portrayal of where the band stand at this time — and even that is evolving." Ryan Leas from Stereogum listed it as the best album of its release week, praising the production and the band's story-telling.

B.Sassons of PopMatters lauded the experimental production, poetic lyricism, and versatile vocal delivery, saying that "For the First Time maintains a well-tempered intensity refined in its delivery but honest in its angst." Pastes Max Freedman agreed, adding that the album showcased "a clear preference for atmospherics over post-punk." Kyle Kohner of Beats Per Minute likened the album's '90s experimental rock sound to that of American rock band Slint, further writing that the band "devised a record – and sound – unrivaled by most acts emerging from the latest post-punk resurgence." Luke Cartledge of NME dubbed the album as "utterly mesmerising," saying that "For The First Time is a triumph, both as a document of who this band have been up to now, and a thrilling hint as to where they may head next." Reviewing for AllMusic, Paul Simpson felt that "occasionally the vocals (and the constant name-dropping) become overbearing, but the musicianship is strong and adventurous, taking familiar instrumentation in unexpected directions, and Black Country, New Road are undeniably original." musicOMHs Matt Cotsell was positive in his review, writing, "Black Country, New Road are no gods, but this inventive and likeable album should earn them a million or so disciples."

Alex Cabré of DIY was less favourable in his review of the album, saying that it was "perhaps less an album to be enjoyed as a cerebral puzzle to be tackled." In a more negative review, Roisin O'Connor of The Independent said that the record was "a letdown after the early hype" and felt "tedious and predictable."

Accolades

Track listing

Personnel
Black Country, New Road
 Isaac Wood – vocals, lead guitar
 Luke Mark – guitar
 May Kershaw – keyboards
 Georgia Ellery – violin
 Lewis Evans – saxophone
 Tyler Hyde – bass
 Charlie Wayne – drums

Additional personnel
 Andy Savours – production, mixing, engineering
 Guy Davie – mastering
 Bart Price – artwork
 Joshua Rumble – assistance

Charts

References

2021 debut albums
Black Country, New Road albums
Ninja Tune albums